Was It Love? is a South Korean television series starring Song Ji-hyo, Son Ho-jun, Song Jong-ho, Kim Min-jun, Koo Ja-sung and Kim Da-som. It aired on JTBC from July 8 to September 2, 2020; each episode was released on Netflix in South Korea and internationally after their television broadcast.

Synopsis
Noh Ae-jung (Song Ji-hyo) is a single mother with a strong survival instinct who has been single for 14 years. All of a sudden, four men who appeal to her in different ways appear in her life. She had past friendships and relationships with three out of four of these men before her pregnancy. Oh Dae-oh (Son Ho-jun) is a bad but attractive man, Ryu Jin (Song Jong-ho) is pathetic but handsome and rich actor, Goo Pa-do (Kim Min-jun) who is scary and sexy, and Oh Yeon-woo (Koo Ja-sung) is a flirty younger man.

Cast

Main
 Song Ji-hyo as Noh Ae-jung / Tan Ziyi
 Noh Ae-jung is a film producer who has been struggling while raising her child on her own for 14 years. When four men appear in her life, they reawaken her sense of self.
 Tan Ziyi is Dong-chan's mother and the wife of a Hong Kong gang leader.
 Son Ho-jun as Oh Dae-oh / Cheon Eok-man
A bestselling novelist as well as a screenwriter who writes for Hollywood movies, but his real self is hidden behind a veil.
 Song Jong-ho as Ryu Jin
An actor with the nickname Nation's Male Friend. When he was at university, he majored in theater and film. His popularity rapidly increased.
 Kim Min-jun as Koo Pa-do
CEO of a financial company called Nine Capital. He is Dong-chan's adoptive father and is a former gangster who started a new life and earned the nickname "Robin Hood of the private loan industry".
 Koo Ja-sung as Oh Yeon-woo
A physical education instructor. His good looks and charming smile make him one of the most popular teachers at school.
 Kim Da-som as Joo Ah-rin
A top star actress.

Supporting
 Kim Mi-kyung as Choi Hyang-ja, Noh Ae-jung's mother.
 Uhm Chae-young as Noh Ha-nee, Noh Ae-jung's daughter
 Kim Young-ah as Kang Suk-hee, owner of SuKey Bar; Noh Ae-jung's friend and landlady.
 Baek Soo-hee as Choi Hye-jin, a first-year producer at Thumb Film Studio.
 Kim Byung-choon as Mr. Wang, CEO of Thumb Film Studio.
 Jin Hee-kyung as Joo Bo-hye, Oh Yeon-woo's mother.
 Oh Hee-joon as Do Gwang-soo, Ah-rin's manager.
 Yoon Seong-woo as Koo Dong-chan, Pa-do's son and Ha-nee's friend.
 Lee Kyo-yeob as Director Kim 
 Lee Hwa-ryong as Myeong Kwae-nam, Ryu Jin's manager.
 Seo Jeong-yeon as Jennifer Song, CEO of Ryu Jin's agency Ssong Entertainment.
 Bae In-hyuk as Novel swordsman

Special appearances
 Kim Kwang-gyu as Hong Pyeon, editor-in-chief (Ep. 2-5, 16)
 Kim Ji-min as Cheon Eok-man’s book concert MC (Ep. 2)
 Hong Yoon-hwa as Ryu Jin’s radio show DJ (Ep. 4)
 SF9 as themselves (Ep. 6)
 Ahn Suk-hwan as island resident (Ep. 8-9)

Viewership

References

External links
  
 
 
 

JTBC television dramas
2020 South Korean television series debuts
2020 South Korean television series endings
South Korean romantic comedy television series
Television series about filmmaking
Television series about single parent families
Television series by JTBC Studios
Korean-language Netflix exclusive international distribution programming